Simbo is an administrative ward in Kigoma Rural District of Kigoma Region in Tanzania. Prior to 2014 the ward was in the Uvinza District before moving to the Kigoma District.

In 2016 the Tanzania National Bureau of Statistics report there were 34,838 people in the ward, from 31,650 in 2012.

Hamlets 
The ward has 7 hamlets.
 Machazo A
 Machazo B
 Machazo C
 Mizizini A
 Mizizini B
 Simbo A Kati
 Simbo B Kati

References

Wards of Kigoma Region